The 2015 Memphis Open was a tennis tournament, played on indoor hard courts.  It was the 41st edition of the event known that year as the Memphis Open, and part of the ATP World Tour 250 series of the 2015 ATP World Tour. It took place at the Racquet Club of Memphis in Memphis, United States, from 9 through 15 February 2015. First-seeded Kei Nishikori won the singles title.

Points and prize money

Point distribution

Prize money

Singles main-draw entrants

Seeds

1 Rankings as of February 2, 2015

Other entrants 
The following players received wildcards into the main draw:
 Kevin Anderson
 Jared Donaldson
 Stefan Kozlov

The following players received entry from the qualifying draw:
 Ryan Harrison
 Thanasi Kokkinakis
 Austin Krajicek
 Denis Kudla

The following player received entry as a lucky loser:
 Filip Krajinović

Withdrawals 
Before the tournament
  Peter Gojowczyk → replaced by  Dustin Brown
  Dudi Sela → replaced by  Filip Krajinović
  Jack Sock → replaced by  Lukáš Lacko

Doubles main-draw entrants

Seeds 

1 Rankings are as of February 2, 2015.

Other entrants 
The following pairs received wildcards into the main draw:
 Stefan Kozlov /  Denis Kudla
 Michael Mmoh /  Francis Tiafoe

Withdrawals
During the tournament
  Teymuraz Gabashvili (shoulder injury)

Finals

Singles 

  Kei Nishikori defeated  Kevin Anderson, 6–4, 6–4

Doubles 

  Mariusz Fyrstenberg /  Santiago González defeated  Artem Sitak /  Donald Young, 5–7, 7–6(7–1), [10–8]

References

External links 
 

Memphis Open
Memphis Open
Memphis Open
Memphis Open (tennis)